The Defensive Player of the Year Award is given by the Associated Press (AP) to the most outstanding defensive player in the National Football League (NFL) at the end of every season. It has been awarded since 1971. The winner is decided by votes from a panel of 50 AP sportswriters.  Since 2011, the award has been presented at the annual NFL Honors ceremony the day before the Super Bowl, along with other AP awards, such as the AP NFL Offensive Player of the Year Award, AP NFL Most Valuable Player Award, and AP NFL Rookie of the Year Award.

Lawrence Taylor, J. J. Watt, and Aaron Donald  are the only three-time winners of the award. Joe Greene, Ray Lewis, Mike Singletary, Bruce Smith, and Reggie White have each won it twice. Taylor is the only player to win the award as a rookie, doing so in 1981. In 2008, James Harrison became the only undrafted free agent to win the award. White is the only player to win the award with two different teams, winning in 1987 with the Philadelphia Eagles and again with the Green Bay Packers in 1998. J. J. Watt is the only player to win the award unanimously, receiving 50 out of 50 first place votes in 2014. He was also a near-unanimous winner in 2012 as he earned 49 out of 50 votes.

As of the end of the 2022 NFL season, linebackers have won the award seventeen times, more than any other position. A defensive end has won fourteen times, followed by ten defensive tackles, six cornerbacks, and five safeties. Only two winners of the AP Defensive Player of the Year Award have also won the AP's Most Valuable Player Award for the same season: defensive tackle Alan Page in 1971 for the Minnesota Vikings and linebacker Lawrence Taylor in 1986 for the New York Giants. Nick Bosa is the incumbent holder of the award, winning it for the 2022 NFL season.

Winners

Multiple Time Winners

See also 
 National Football League Defensive Player of the Year Award for an overview of similar awards by other organizations
 Newspaper Enterprise Association NFL Defensive Player of the Year Award
 Pro Football Writers Association NFL Defensive Player of the Year
 Kansas City Committee of 101 AFC and NFC Defensive Players of the Year
 Associated Press NFL Offensive Player of the Year Award

References
General
 
 
 
Footnotes

National Football League trophies and awards
Associated Press awards